San Martín is a city in the north-center part of the Mendoza Province in Argentina. It is the capital of the San Martín Department and constitutes, with Palmira and La Colonia, the third-largest metropolitan area in the province.

History
The first San Martín inhabitants were the Huarpe Milkayak people. The territory was governed by the tribal chief called Pallamay until 1563, when the first Europeans under the command of the Captain Pedro Moyano Cornejo, arrived to the area.

The city was known as Rodeo de Moyano or, alternatively, as La Reducción (Spanish: The Reduction); but its name was changed to Villa Los Barriales in 1816, when it was included in the Corocorto Priesthood of Mendoza Province and officially established by the Governor of Mendoza, Toribio de Luzuriaga.

San Martín came into prominence in the war of the Argentine independence period, when José de San Martín received an extensive land grant in the area to take advantage of agriculture and help the Chilean army of Bernardo O'Higgins in an effort to prevent new Spanish invasions from Chile to Argentina. In 1823, the governor Pedro Molina changed the name of the city yet again in homage to the Argentine general José de San Martín, who, besides his inestimable historical role, contributed many innovations to the local farming sector and in viticulture, particularly.

In 1885, the first railway arrived in San Martin, uniting Buenos Aires with Mendoza and Chile. This development brought many Italian immigrants to the area from Buenos Aires; during the 1950s and '60s, National Route 7 was built between Buenos Aires and Mendoza Province, converting the city into an important distribution center along the most important highway between Buenos Aires and Santiago, Chile.

Climate

See also
Mendoza wine

References
 :es:San Martín (Mendoza)

Notes

External links

 Official Site
 Atlético Club San Martín
 San Martín Tourism Guide
Vineyards in the East Zone of Mendoza 

Populated places in Mendoza Province
Wine regions of Argentina
Cities in Argentina
Argentina
Mendoza Province